" I'll Be Home on Christmas Day" is a Christmas song recorded by Elvis Presley for his 1971 album Elvis sings The Wonderful World of Christmas. It has since been played every Christmas in Times Square to kick off the Macy's Thanksgiving Day Parade.

Elvis Presley songs
1971 songs
American Christmas songs